Andreas Hallager   (28 August 1796 – 9 December 1853) was a Danish musician, orchestra leader, and composer.

Career
Beginning his musical career at the age of 7, Hallager became a hoboist (musician) at the Danish Civilian Infantry. From 1816 to 1821, he played in the orchestra of the Livjæger Corps. From 1821-1822 he resided in St. Petersburg. During his residency there, he was offered a post in the opera orchestra, but kindly refused. From 1825-1848, he was the head of the music of the Prins Christian Frederiks Regiment and the Second Infantry Brigade in Stockholm.

Personal life
Hallager was married to Anne Margrethe Degen from 1828 to his death. He was the father of Søffren Degen.

Honors
Hallager was awarded the Swedish Medal of Merit, the Dannebrog Order, and the Dannebrog Men's Sign of Honor.

Music
 Musical New Gift  Copenhagen, 1835
 Eight Romans  Copenhagen, 1836
 Apolloharpen  Copenhagen, 1837
 A scene from the play The Two Brothers  1835

There are a few arrangements of Hallager for guitar, namely the Spanish dance El Jaleo de Xeres and Cachucha from August Bournonville's Ballet Toreadore.

Hallager released three collections of songs that got a hard drive in AP Berggreens's reviews: "Compositions that cast down such a lack of awareness and lack of knowledge in the theory, like these, are really under all criticism."

See also
List of Danish composers

References

This article was initially translated from the Danish Wikipedia.

External links
 The Royal Library's focal page about Hallager

Danish composers
Male composers
1796 births
1853 deaths
19th-century male musicians